My Fair Son is a 2005 Chinese gay-themed film (first released for public exhibition in the United States in 2009), by Chinese film director Cui Zi'en. The main characters are Rui (Ray) and the object of his affection, Bo, an employee of his father. The film contains full-frontal male nudity.

Plot
A teenage boy, Ray, returns home from a life with his grandfather to live with his father, after they have been estranged for several years. During the period of their estrangement, Ray spent much of his youth rebelling against his father's lifestyle. After he enrolls in an art school, Ray becomes romantically involved, in a relationship, with another male student, and the pair soon become lovers. His father discovers the two young men in bed together, and begins to understand what it means to live as a homosexual. Ray then meets one of his father's employees, Bo, and falls in love with him, too. Bo is engaged, and admits to Ray's father that he is in love with his son. The father fires Bo and lies to Ray that he left on his own will. Ray does not accept his father's argument. The film ends with Ray roaming on a terrace with floating transparent images of his childhood pictures.

Cast
 Junrui Wang as Xiao Rui (Ray)
 Weiming Wang as Father of Xiao Rui	
 Yu Bo as Xiao Bo
 Guifeng Wang as Unnamed first boyfriend of Xiao Rui	
 Ziqiang Li as Unnamed friend of Xiao Rui

See also
 List of Chinese films of 2005
 List of lesbian, gay, bisexual or transgender-related films
 List of lesbian, gay, bisexual, or transgender-related films by storyline
 Nudity in film (East Asian cinema since 1929)

References

External links
 
 Filmmaker Cui Zi'en on dGenerate Films website

2005 films
Chinese independent films
Chinese LGBT-related films
Films directed by Cui Zi'en
Films set in China
Gay-related films
LGBT-related drama films
2000s Mandarin-language films
2005 LGBT-related films